The 2nd Biathlon World Championships were held in 1959 in Courmayeur, Italy. The men's 20 km individual and team were the only competitions.

Men's results

20 km individual

Each shot missing the target gave a penalty of 2 minutes.

20 km team

The times of the top 3 athletes from each nation in the individual race were added together.

Medal table

References

1959
Biathlon World Championships
International sports competitions hosted by Italy
1959 in Italian sport
Biathlon competitions in Italy
Sport in Courmayeur